The 1960 Drexel Dragons football team represented the Drexel Institute of Technology (renamed Drexel University in 1970) as a member of the Middle Atlantic Conference during the 1960 NCAA College Division football season.  Jack Hinkle was the team's head coach.

Schedule

Roster

References

Drexel
Drexel Dragons football seasons
College football winless seasons
Drexel Dragons football